Donald Vickers Toase (31 December 1929 – 1992) was an English footballer who played as a full back in the Football League for Darlington. He was on the books of Portsmouth and Newcastle United, without playing League football for either, and played non-league football for South Shields.

Toase played for the England youth team that won the inaugural edition of the FIFA Youth Tournament in 1948 (which became the UEFA European Under-19 Championship).

Notes

References

1929 births
1992 deaths
Footballers from Darlington
English footballers
England youth international footballers
Association football fullbacks
Portsmouth F.C. players
Newcastle United F.C. players
Darlington F.C. players
South Shields F.C. (1936) players
English Football League players
Date of death missing